Liam Bossin (born 15 July 1996) is a professional footballer who plays as a goalkeeper for Eerste Divisie side FC Dordrecht. Born in Belgium, he has represented Ireland at youth level.

Club career

Belgium
At the age of 16, Bossin debuted for RWS Bruxelles in the Belgian Second Division. He made three appearances for the club before signing for Anderlecht, Belgium's most successful club, where would he mainly feature for the club's reserve team. In late 2016, he went on trial with Barnsley and stated that he was looking to spend time out on loan but his club decided against this.

England
In 2017, he signed for English EFL Championship outfit Nottingham Forest having failed to make an appearance for Anderlecht. However, he failed to mane an appearance there due to a change of head coach. He spent two years at the club and was released by at the end of the 2018–19 season. After being released by Nottingham Forest, Bossin spent time on trial with EFL League Two side Swindon Town, playing in a friendly game against Manchester United XI but ultimately not signing for the club.

Ireland
Bossin signed for Cork City in the League of Ireland Premier Division ahead of the 2020 season. His debut came in the opening game of the season, a 1–0 loss to newly promoted Shelbourne. In February 2020 Bossin was hospitalised following a head injury against Finn Harps, being discharged the next day. On 4 August 2020, he played in the Munster Senior Cup Final as his side were beaten 2–0 by non league club Rockmount after extra time. Bossin finished the season with ten appearances in all competitions as Cork finished bottom of the table and were relegated to the League of Ireland First Division.

Netherlands
Bossin signed for Eerste Divisie side FC Dordrecht in January 2021. He made his debut in a 3–0 loss to Almere City on 22 January 2021.

International career
Despite being born in Belgium, Bossin qualifies to play for the Republic of Ireland through his Irish mother who is from Carrick-on-Suir. He has played for the Republic of Ireland U19s as well as the Republic of Ireland U21s.

Career statistics

References

External links
 

1996 births
Living people
People from Woluwe-Saint-Pierre
Belgian people of Irish descent
Irish people of Belgian descent
Republic of Ireland association footballers
Belgian footballers
Footballers from Brussels
Association football goalkeepers
Republic of Ireland youth international footballers
Republic of Ireland under-21 international footballers
English Football League players
League of Ireland players
Eerste Divisie players
RWS Bruxelles players
Cork City F.C. players
Nottingham Forest F.C. players
R.S.C. Anderlecht players
FC Dordrecht players
Republic of Ireland expatriate association footballers
Belgian expatriate footballers
Irish expatriate sportspeople in England
Belgian expatriate sportspeople in England
Expatriate footballers in England
Irish expatriate sportspeople in the Netherlands
Belgian expatriate sportspeople in the Netherlands
Expatriate footballers in the Netherlands